In the wake of the 2007 financial crisis Germany's stock of gross financial assets increased
significantly, turning it into the second largest stock among OECD countries after the US.

List

Further government ownerships 
 a range of competing Landesbanken, regionally organised by the Länder, function predominantly to provide wholesale banking, part of the Sparkassen-Finanzgruppe
 the Sparkassen, also part of the Sparkassen-Finanzgruppe with more than 400 German SOEs holding more than 40% of bank assets in Germany
 Germany owns an approximate 4% stake in British Telecom as 12% of the stake of British Telecom was sold to T-Mobile in early 2015.
Note that many smaller State owned enterprises are owned by individual states of Germany such as TransnetBW and Rothaus (State Brewery of Baden).

References

 
Germany